Ovenden is a village and a ward to the north of Halifax in the metropolitan borough of Calderdale, West Yorkshire, England.  It contains twelve listed buildings that are recorded in the National Heritage List for England.  Of these, one is at Grade II*, the middle of the three grades, and the others are at Grade II, the lowest grade.  Most of the listed buildings are houses, and the others consist of two churches and a drinking fountain.


Key

Buildings

References

Citations

Sources

Lists of listed buildings in West Yorkshire